Franklin C. Southworth (born 1929) is an American linguist and Professor Emeritus of South Asian linguistics at the University of Pennsylvania.

Publications 

South Asia: Dravidian linguistic history in The Encyclopedia of Global Human Migration (2013)
Rice in Dravidian (2011)
Proto-Dravidian Agriculture
Linguistic archaeology of South Asia (2005)
Prehistoric implications of the Dravidian element in the NIA lexicon, with special reference to Marathi (2005)
Reconstructing social context from language: Indo-Aryan and Dravidian prehistory (1995)
South Asian emblematic gestures (1992)
The reconstruction of prehistoric South Asian language contact (1990)
Linguistic archaeology and the Indus Valley culture (1989)
Ancient economic plants of South Asia: linguistic archaeology and early agriculture (1988)    
The social context of language standardization (1985)
Dravidian and Indo-European: the neglected relationship (1982)
Lexical evidence for early contacts between Indo-Aryan and Dravidian (1979)

References 

Living people
Linguists from the United States
University of Pennsylvania faculty
1929 births